Mombasa Air Services, a Kenya air charter firm, was created when John Cleave purchased Rapid Air, a Civil Aviation Board licensed air charter firm with bases in Nyeri and Diani Beach. Flight operations were switched to the coast city of Mombasa, to serve the newly growing coast tourism industry and the company name was changed to Mombasa Air Services. During the seventies, eighties and nineties, Mombasa was restricted by existent colonial legislation, from receiving international scheduled services, which were all directed to the capital city of Nairobi. During the seventies and eighties, the Kenya coast was a recently discovered exotic tourism destination and direct charter flights from Europe grew rapidly and many new beach hotels were built to receive an increasing number of tourist arrivals from Europe.

During the colonial era, a number of large land areas were set aside as wildlife conservancies under the protection of the Kenya Game Department, which, after independence, became the Kenya Wildlife Service. Kenya is known as the birthplace of the safari, an expedition or journey into the bush to see and shoot wildlife. These adventures were made famous by the rich and famous that included, in 1909, the former American President Theodore Roosevelt. Hunting, however became banned, and the growing global realization of the value of protecting wildlife, coupled with long range jet travel meant that the Kenya coast, with unspoilt tropical beaches close to world-famous wildlife parks, generated a steady demand for local tourist flights to visit the game parks.

MAS grew a fleet of piston engined aircraft to handle the local charter demand to game parks and other places of tourist interest. At its peak the charter firm had 12 aircraft, some owned and some leased. All the aircraft were maintained by CMC Aviation owned by the publicly traded Cooper Motor Corporation. To provide capital and purchase larger, more reliable turbo-prop aircraft to operate scheduled services, the firm was sold to CMC who subsequently sold to the Sameer Group and the operations moved to Nairobi. The purchase of turbo-prop aircraft did not occur at that time, and the start up of domestic scheduled tourist services from Mombasa to the game parks was delayed until the nineties.

Aircraft to right is a Cessna 402B , 5Y-ATI operated by Malindi Air Services, during 1979 and possibly later. This ten seat aircraft flew daily, on a schedule run to Lamu from Malindi. Also operated on multi day "Flug Safaris" from Malindi, or Mombasa to Game Parks such as Amboseli, Samburu , and the Masai Mara.

Fleet
1 X Britten-Norman Trislander 18 seats
2 X Britten-Norman Islander 10 seats
3 X Cessna 404. 14 seats
1 X Piper Navajo.
4 X Piper Seneca. 6 seats.
2 X Cherokee 6. 6 seats.

Status
At December 2010, this airline is out of service but Mombasa Air Safari is now under the same ownership as the original Mombasa Air Services, and continues to operate from Moi Airport and  Ukunda.

Destinations
Air Charter services throughout East Africa but mainly to Amboseli, Tsavo, Mara, Samburu, Lamu and Lake Nakuru in Kenya, and in Tanzania Lake Manyara, Ngorongoro and the Serengeti plus Zanzibar.

Key people
John Cleave, Christine Cronchey, Robert Grumbley, Twig Walsh, and Chris Gallagher.

References

Sources
 Kenya Civil Aviation Authority
 World Airline Directory. 1981.
 Kenya Air Operators Association

External links
 

Defunct airlines of Kenya
Airlines established in 1974
Airlines disestablished in 1985
1975 disestablishments in Kenya
Kenyan companies established in 1974